Byron J. Langley (November 11, 1926 – January 13, 2018), was an American North Dakota democratic politician who was a member of the North Dakota House of Representatives. He represented the 12th district from 1973 to 1980. He also served in the North Dakota Senate from 1985 to 1996. On April 21, 1993 the Fifty-third Legislative Assembly unanimously elected Langley to the office of the President Pro Tempore; which he held through 1994.

Langley served on numerous committees some of which included: Chairman Senate Industry, Business and Labor Committee, Member Senate Agriculture Committee, Natural Resources Committee and Waste Management Committee, member of the Governor’s Fuel Assistance Advisory Commission, and member of Veterinarian School Committee of Old West Regional Commission. Langley retired from politics in 1996.

Langley was also a member of the Warwick Lutheran Church, Warwick Rod and Gun Club, Devils Lake Elks, New Rockford Eagles, North Dakota Stockmen’s Association, and served as a trustee of the North Dakota Cowboy Hall of Fame. He was also a strong supporter of the North Dakota National Guard.

Statement issued by U.S. Senator Heidi Heitkamp (January 19, 2018)

References

1926 births
2018 deaths
People from Benson County, North Dakota
Democratic Party North Dakota state senators
Farmers from North Dakota
Ranchers from North Dakota
Democratic Party members of the North Dakota House of Representatives